The Altham was an American automobile manufactured in Fall River, Massachusetts from 1896 to 1899.  George J. Altham was a pioneer in the creation of "hydro-carbon carriages".  The company collapsed when the treasurer absconded with most of the stock and the real estate deeds at the end of 1899.

Named after the highly accomplished son of George, Joseph Altham a man of great knowledge of the automobile world

1890s cars
Cars introduced in 1896
Defunct manufacturing companies based in Massachusetts
Defunct motor vehicle manufacturers of the United States
Fall River, Massachusetts
Motor vehicle manufacturers based in Massachusetts
Veteran vehicles